Victor Lundberg (September 2, 1923 – February 14, 1990) was an American radio personality. He is best known for a spoken-word record called "An Open Letter to My Teenage Son", which became an unlikely Top 10 hit in 1967.

Lundberg was born in Grand Rapids, Michigan and was a newscaster at Grand Rapids radio station WMAX when he released "An Open Letter" in September 1967.  The lyrics, written by Robert R Thompson and produced by Jack Tracy, imagine the narrator talking to his teenage son.  (In real life, Lundberg had at least one male teenager in his household at the time.)  Lundberg touches on hippies, the Vietnam War, and patriotism.  The voice-over, spoken over "Battle Hymn of the Republic", after empathizing, somewhat, with a number of the typical teenage concerns of the day, the record memorably ends with Lundberg telling his son that, if the teen burns his draft card, then he should "burn [his] birth certificate at the same time.  From that moment on, I have no son."

"An Open Letter to My Teenage Son"
"An Open Letter" became a hit in Michigan and was released nationally by Liberty Records, jumping onto the Billboard Hot 100 at #84 on November 11, 1967.  Within three weeks the record went #58 - #18 - #10, making it one of the dozen or so fastest-climbing records in Hot 100 history up to that point, and Lundberg made an appearance on The Ed Sullivan Show on November 12, 1967.  After another week at #10, the record slipped to #22 for the week ending December 16, 1967, then vanished from the Hot 100 completely, after a total run of just six weeks. Few other records have ever been ranked so high in such a short chart stay on the Hot 100 (Napoleon XIV's "They're Coming to Take Me Away, Ha-Haaa!" peaked at #3 but was only on the Hot 100 for six weeks; Kenny G's "Auld Lang Syne" (The Millennium Mix) peaked at #7 but was only the Hot 100 for five weeks) before the spate of records that have been doing so, starting in 2008 (see Biggest drops off the Hot 100 in List of Billboard Hot 100 chart achievements and milestones).  However, it sold over one million copies within a month of release and was awarded a gold disc.  "An Open Letter" also received a Grammy Award nomination for Best Spoken Word Recording, losing to Senator Everett McKinley Dirksen's "Gallant Men".

"An Open Letter" spawned at least ten "response" records. Most of these spoken-word records all have the father's son write a response to what the father had said. The son's response varies from letter to letter, depending on the nature of the records.

The record was heavily criticised in a scathing review by William Zinsser, "The Pitfalls of Pop's Pompous Pop-off", in Life Magazine, 5 January 1968.

Later years
Encouraged by the single's success, Liberty released an entire album of Lundberg's musings, entitled An Open Letter (LST 7547) that failed to chart. The album featured ten selections, many of which took a less strongly conservative line than "Teenage Son". "My Buddy Carl" (originally the B-side of the hit single) decried racial prejudice, while "On Censorship", takes an almost Libertarian view of "self-appointed ... censorious do-gooders". (Lundberg is sometimes identified as a leader of the Libertarian Party, but sources differ as to whether he was actually a member; the national party was not formed until 1971.)

Lundberg released one more record, in 1968: "Take Two (For the Relief of Racial Tension)" b/w "Impressions of Victor Lundberg", on the Buddah label. It was not a hit.  Lundburg continued his career in radio broadcasting throughout; he voiced a large number of nationally-aired commercials (notably, Peter Max commercials), and was an on-air personality part-time, even in retirement.  His last regular live radio show ended in 1979 on what was then WYBR, in Belvidere (Rockford), Illinois.  Victor Lundburg died in 1990.

References

American radio personalities
1923 births
1990 deaths
People from Grand Rapids, Michigan